Dicentrus bluthneri is a species of beetle in the family Cerambycidae. It was described by John Lawrence LeConte in 1880.

References

Cerambycinae
Beetles described in 1880